Krzczonów Landscape Park (Krzczonowski Park Krajobrazowy) is a protected area (Landscape Park) in eastern Poland, established in 1990, covering an area of .

The Park lies within Lublin Voivodeship.

References 

Landscape parks in Poland
Parks in Lublin Voivodeship